Estakhr-e Posht Rural District is a rural district (dehestan) in Hezarjarib District, Neka County, Mazandaran Province, Iran. At the 2006 census, its population was 5,277, in 1,218 families. The rural district has 22 villages.

References 

Rural Districts of Mazandaran Province
Neka County